William Evans Burney (September 11, 1893 – January 29, 1969) was an American businessman and politician who briefly served as a Democratic U.S. Representative from Colorado from 1940 to 1941. He was elected to fill the vacancy created by the death of Representative John Andrew Martin.

Early life and career
Born in Hubbard, Texas, Burney attended the public schools in Texas and the University of New Mexico at Albuquerque.
During the First World War, he served in the United States Navy.
He moved to Pueblo, Colorado, in 1924 and built a career in the life insurance business.
He served as member of the Pueblo board of education from 1937 to 1943.
He also served as member of the United States Army Reserve Corps 1924 to 1942, eventually earning the rank of major.

Election to Congress
Burney was elected as a Democrat to the Seventy-sixth Congress to fill the vacancy caused by the death of John A. Martin. The seat had been vacant for nearly a year as Martin had died late in 1939.

Burney served from November 5, 1940, to January 3, 1941 and did not seek re-election to a full term in the Seventy-seventh Congress.

Career after Congress
He was called to active duty in the Army in January 1942 and was promoted to the rank of lieutenant colonel in October 1942. He returned to the United States from India and took command of Camp Ross in May 1945. He left the service in December 1945 with the rank of colonel.

After leaving the military, he resumed his career in the life insurance business until his retirement.

He died in Denver, Colorado, January 29, 1969 and was interred in Fairmount Cemetery in Denver.

References

External links

1893 births
1969 deaths
Democratic Party members of the United States House of Representatives from Colorado
United States Army officers
20th-century American politicians
People from Hubbard, Texas
Military personnel from Texas